Jim Boudreaux (born October 11, 1944) is a former American football tackle and defensive end. He played for the Boston Patriots from 1966 to 1968.

References

1944 births
Living people
American football tackles
American football defensive ends
Louisiana Tech Bulldogs football players
Boston Patriots players